Sreekumaran Thampi (born 16 March 1940) is an Indian lyricist, music director, director, producer, and screenwriter in Malayalam cinema. He also writes poetry and is a recipient of the Vallathol Award. In 2017, he was awarded the J. C. Daniel Award, Kerala government's highest honour for contributions to Malayalam cinema.

Film career
Thampi was introduced to the Malayalam film industry in 1966 by P. Subramaniam as a lyricist in the film Kaattumallika. He has produced 25 films, directed 29, and written scripts for 85 films in Malayalam besides writing thousands of songs. He is also the author of the well-known literary work Prem Nazir Enna Prema Gaanam. He won the National Award for Best Book on Cinema film (Kanakkum Kavitayum) whilst his films Gaanam and Mohiniyattam won Kerala State Awards.

He is a songwriter, screenplay writer, film producer, director and musician, but says he is more of a lyricist than a filmmaker. His songs include "Chandrikayilaliyunna Chandrakaantham", "Hridayasarasile pranayapushpame" and "Swanthamenna padathinendhartham". His films Chandrakantham, Gaanam, Mohiniyattam, Maalika Paniyunnavar, Jeevitham Oru Gaanam and Ambalavilakku became artistic successes. His successful box office films include Naayattu, Aakramanam and Idi Muzhakkam.

Thampi has written four novels - Kakkathampuraatti, Kuttanad, Kadalum Karalum and Njanoru Kadha Parayam and collections of poems Engineerayuday Veena, Neelathaamara, En Makan Karayumpol,  Sheershakamillatha Kavithakal, Achante Chumbanam, Ammakkoru Tharaattu. Puthralaabham and Avaseshippukal. His collection of 1001 selected songs, titled Hridaya Sarassu, had three editions in two years. Now going to its sixth Edition. His selected Poems are published in Hindi with the title "Sreekumaran Thampi Ki Kavithayem".

Personal life
He is a graduate in mathematics from Sanatana Dharma College,Alappuzha and civil engineer, graduated from Institute of Engineering Technology, Chennai and Govt. Engineering College, Thrissur.

His siblings are the novelist late P. Vasudevan Thampi who wrote Sreekrishnaparinthu (which became a hit Malayalam film), Advocate P. Gopalakrishnan Thampi, the former Director General of Prosecutions (Kerala), and former Chairman of Kerala Bar Council, ThulasibhaThiruvananthapuram kachi and Prasannavadanan Thampi, former Vice President of Oracle Financial Systems Software Ltd.

Thampi is married to Rajeswari, the daughter of Vaikom M P.Mani, and they have a daughter (Kavitha). His wife and daughter have also dabbled in the arts. He also had a son, Rajkumaran Thampi (also known as Raj Aditya) was an erstwhile associate of Priyadarshan and later directed some movies in the Telugu film industry, until his sudden death in Secundarabad in March 2009.

Awards

National Film Awards
 1989 - Best Book on Cinema – Cinema, Kannakkum Kavithayum

Kerala State Film Awards

 1971 - Best Lyricist – Vilakku Vangiya Veena & Lankadahanam
 1976 - Best Film with Popular Appeal and Aesthetic Value – Mohiniyattam
 1981 - Best Film with Popular Appeal and Aesthetic Value – Gaanam
 2011 - Best Lyricist – Naayika
 2017 - J. C. Daniel Award

Filmfare Award South
 1976 - Best Director - Malayalam – Mohiniyattam

 Other Film Awards

 1974 - Kerala Film Goers Award (Film - Chandrakantham)
 1976 - Kerala Film Fans Award (Film - Mohiniyattam)
 1976 - Madras Film Fans Award (Film - Mohiniyattam)
 1976 - Cinema Masika Trophy (Film - Mohiniyattam)
 1981 - Madras Film Fans Special Award (Film - Gaanam)
 1996 - Government of Kerala Veteran Cine Artists Award
 Other Lifetime Achievement Awards
 2002 - Prem Nazir Foundation Award - Lifetime Achievement Award
 2006 - Dubai Priyadarshini's Lifetime Achievement Award
 2007 - Ragalaya (Mumbai) Lifetime Achievement in Film Music
 2009 - Swathi Lifetime Achievement Award 
 2010 - Sangam Kala Group, New Delhi Chapter Lifetime Achieement Award
 2011 - G. Devarajan Master Puraskaaram (Devadaru) 
 2012 - U.A.E Devarajan Foundation Lifetime Achievement Award
 2012 - Muthukulam Raghavan Pillai Memorial Award for Lifetime Achievement in Cinema
 2012 - A. P. Udhayabhanu Memorial Award (VARADA Award) for Lifetime Achievement in Cinema, Television and Literature
 2012 - Surya TV (SUN NETWORK) Living Legend Award in Indian Cinema
 2012 - Parvathi Padmam Award for Lifetime Achievement in Cinema and Literature
 2013 - Amrita TV Film Award for Lifetime Achievement in Cinema
 2014 - Radio Mirchi (Times Of India) Award for Lifetime Achievement in Film Music
 2014 - ACV (Asianet Cable Vision) Award for Lifetime Achievement in Cinema
 2014 - Vayalar Rama Varma Sangeetha Puraskaram instituted by Vayalar Samskaarika Vedi - Lifetime Achievement Award
 2014 - Thilakan Foundation Award for Lifetime Achievement in Cinema
 2014 - Parabrahma Chaithanya Award for Lifetime Achievement In Cinema and Literature
 2015 - V. Dakshinamoorthy Sangeetha Sumeru Award instituted by Voice Foundation, Vaikkom
 2015 - Kuwait KALA (Kerala Arts Lovers Association) V Sambasivan Award
 2015 - Samoothiri Raja's Mekkottu Devi Award 
 2015 - Mannam Prathibha Puraskaaram - Lifetime Achievement Award
 2015 - Souparnika Lifetime Achievement Award
 2015 - Mayooram Lifetime Achievement Award
 2015 - Visharad Dakshinamoorthy Puraskaaram - Lifetime Achievement Award
 2015 - Sarath Chandra Marate Award for Lifetime Achievement in Film Music
 2015 - FOMA Award ( Forum of Media People of Mumbai ) Award for Lifetime Achievement in Cinema and Literature.
 2016 - Bharathan Trust's Bharathamudra Award - Lifetime Achievement Award
 2016 - Samoothiri Raja's Kodikkunnu Devi Award for Lifetime Achievement
 2016 - Devarajan Skakthigadha Award -  Lifetime Achievement Award
 2016 - Swaralaya Kairali Yesudas Award - Lifetime Achievemnt Award
 2016 - Thiruvallam Parashurama Swami Temple Award
 2017 - Sangeetha Saparya Award instituted by Sangeethika, Thiruvananthapuram - Lifetime Achievement Award
 2017 - Payyannur Thapasya School of Music Award
 2017 - Bheeshmacharya Puraskaaram instituted by J.C.I. Kodungalloor
 2017 - G. Devarajan Master Navathi Award - Lifetime Achievement in Film Music
 2017 - Rakendu Sangeetha Puraskaram - Lifetime Achievement Award
 2017 - Act Award
 2018 - Swathi Thirunal Sangeethavedi Gurusreshta Puraskaaram - Lifetime Achievement Award
 2018 - Janmabhumi Award - Legends of India - Lifetime Achievement Award
 2018 - Sathyan National Award instituted by Sathyan Foundation - Lifetime Achievement Award
 2019 - Thiruvairurappan Puraskaram 
 2020 - Attukal Bhagavathy Temple Amba Puraskaram 
 2020 - First K. Raghavan Master Foundation Award for Lifetime Achievenment in Cinema
 2021 - First Arjunan Master Award – Arjunopaharam for his contributions to Malayalam film industry.
 2022 - Ravindra Puraskaram instituted by Ravindran Master Memorial Trust . 
 Literary Awards
 2003 - Revathi Pattathanam Krishnageethi Award for the book of Poems - Achante Chumbanam
 2004 - Pravasa Kairali Literary Award ( Baharin) for the  book of poems - Achante Chumbanam
 2005 - Mahakavi Muloor Poetry Award for the book of poems - Sheershakamillaatha Kavithakal
 2008 - Mahakavi Ulloor Award for the book - Achante Chumbanam
 2009 - Sree Padmanabha Swami Balasahithya Award - Omanayude Oru Divasam
 2010 - Odakkuzhal Award for the book of poems - Ammakkoru Tharattu
 2012 - Kozhissheri Balaraman Award for Literature
 2012 - Asan Smaraka Kavitha Puraskaram instituted by Asan Memorial Association, Chennai
 2015 - Naimisharanym Shobhaneeyam Puraskaram for value based poetry
 2015 - Ettumanoor Somadasan Smaraka Award 
 2016 - Vallathol Award:
 2016 - Mayilpeeli Award for Literature
 2016 - Thathvamasi Award in memory of Dr. Sukumar Azhikode
 2016 - EV Krishna Pillai Memorial Award
 2017 - Sukumar Azhikode Memorial Award instituted by 'Kannur Waves', an art and culture lovers association
 2017 - Karyvattam Dharma Shastha Kshethra Shastha Puraskaram
 2018 - Balamani Amma Award instituted by Kochi International Book Festival Committee in the name of poet Balamani Amma
 2018 - Kottarathil Shankunni Memorial Award instituted by Kottarathil Shankunni Smaraka Trust .
 2019 - Thakazhi Literary Award
 2019 - Ochira Sankaran Kutty Sahithya Puraskaram
 2020 - Padmaprabha Literary Award 
 2023 - Thekkanappan Puraskaram .
 2023 - Harivarasanam Award jointly instituted by the Travancore Devaswom Board (TDB) and the government of Kerala.

Filmography

References

External links
 Official website

1940 births
Living people
J. C. Daniel Award winners
Kerala State Film Award winners
Filmfare Awards South winners
Malayali people
Malayalam film directors
Malayalam-language lyricists
Malayalam screenwriters
Malayalam poets
Government Engineering College, Thrissur alumni
People from Alappuzha district
Film directors from Kerala
Indian male screenwriters
20th-century Indian film directors
Film producers from Kerala
21st-century Indian film directors
21st-century Indian dramatists and playwrights
Screenwriters from Kerala
Malayalam film producers
21st-century Indian male writers
21st-century Indian screenwriters